Jaulian (meaning Seat of Saints) is a ruined Buddhist monastery dating from the 2nd century CE, located in Taxila, in Pakistan.

Jaulian, along with the nearby monastery at Mohra Muradu, form part of the Ruins of Taxila – a collection of excavations that were inscribed as a UNESCO World Heritage Site in 1980.

Location
Jaulian is located on a hill 100 metres above the nearby modern village of Jaulian. The cities of Rawalpindi and Islamabad are approximately 35 km and 45 km to the southeast, respectively and situated near Khanpur Taxila road; a picnic place near Khanpur Dam. Jaulian is located near the Mohra Muradu monastery, and the ancient Taxilan city of Sirsukh. Moreover, Piplan Remains, Badalpur Stupa and Jinnah Wali Dheri Stupa are nearby places.

History
Jaulian was built in the 2nd-century CE – around the same time as the nearby Mohra Muradu Jaulian, along with the rest of Ancient Taxila, was devastated in the 450s CE during the invasion of the White Huns, and later abandoned. Subsequent rulers, such as the Hun King Mihirakula, persecuted the region's Buddhists, and the site never recovered.

Excavations
The ruins at Jaulian are situated on a hill top, and consist of: a main central stupa, 27 peripheral smaller stupas, 59 small chapels displaying scenes from the life of Buddha, and two quadrangles around which monastic living quarters were arranged. The form and building of Jaulian is similar to that of the nearby Mohra Muradu.

Main stupa

The main stupa at Jaulian was much smaller than that of Mohra Muradu or the Dharmarajika Stupa, and is badly damaged. It was extensively coated in stucco plaster, as are almost all the sculptures and architectural details. Despite the use of an easily moldable material, the quality of decoration at Jaulian is considered to be less impressive than that of Mohra Muradu.  The original plaster is preserved at some places.

The main stupa is surrounded by 21 smaller "votive stupas" that contained religious iconography – though some posit that some of the votive stupas were actually built as tombs for revered monks. The statues located in the votive stupas are mostly preserved; though a number of have been removed and are housed in museums.the original fabric of the main stupa itself which stands in the middle of the upper court

A statue of Buddha in a votive stupa with a hole in the navel was called the "Healing Buddha". Pilgrims would put their fingers in the icon's navel, and pray for cures of various ailment. A 5th century inscription preserved under the statue shows that it was given by a friar Budhamitra Dharmanandin.

Monastery

The monastery at Jaulian is similar to that of nearby Mohra Muradu. Jaulian monastery was a two-level building that contained 28 students' rooms on the first floor, and 28 more on the second floor. The two levels are connected by stone stairs which are still preserved.  Some of the rooms contain preserved statues of the Buddha. Each room had a niche to hold lamps, and a window offering a source of fresh air and natural light. The windows were designed to be narrower at the outer edge, of and larger at the inner edge in order guard against wild animals. The rooms were plastered and decorated with plasterwork and paintings.

As was common at other large monasteries in the Gandhara region such as Takht-i-Bahi and Dharmarajika, a section of the monastery was set aside specifically for the production of Buddhist manuscripts, typically on birch bark, a highly perishable material.

The monastery further contained a large pool that was used for washing, and a kitchen. A stone for grinding spices is well- preserved at the site, as well as two stone mills that were used to grind grains.

Gallery

See also
 List of archaeological sites and monuments in Khyber Pakhtunkhwa

References

External links
 Google images of the site

Buddhist monasteries in Pakistan
Former populated places in Pakistan
World Heritage Sites in Pakistan
Ruins in Pakistan
Ruined abbeys and monasteries
Archaeological sites in Khyber Pakhtunkhwa
2nd-century Buddhism
2nd-century religious buildings and structures